Eburia albolineata is a species of beetle in the family Cerambycidae that is endemic to Venezuela.

References

albolineata
Beetles described in 1944
Endemic fauna of Venezuela
Beetles of South America